
Tuala may refer to:

Surname
Ahsee Tuala, Samoan rugby player
Alvin Tuala, CEO of Samoa Airways
Enari Tuala, Australian rugby league player
Tafaoimalo Leilani Tuala-Warren, Samoan judge

Given name
Aveau Tuala Lepale Niko Faitala Palamo, Samoan politician
Tuala, a fictional character in The Bridei Chronicles
Tuala Ainiu Iusitino (1936–2010), Samoan politician
Tuala Falani Chan Tung, Samoan ambassador to Belgium
Tuala Falenaoti Tiresa Malietoa, Samoan politician and educator
Tuala Mathew M. Vaea, Samoan rugby player

Other uses
Tuala, or taula, a name for Durio graveolens among the Kenyah and Dayak peoples
Tuala, a township in Ongata Rongai, Kenya
Tuala, a village in Moxico Province, Angola

See also
Tual (disambiguation)
Taula (disambiguation)
Tualao, a town in Negros Oriental Province, the Philippines 
Tualeu, a village in West Timor, East Nusa Tenggara Province, Indonesia